Oil Creek is a small river in San Mateo County, California and is a tributary of Pescadero Creek.

References

See also
List of watercourses in the San Francisco Bay Area

Rivers of San Mateo County, California
Rivers of Santa Cruz County, California
Rivers of Northern California
Tributaries of Pescadero Creek